Yagba West is a Local Government Area in Kogi State, Nigeria, in the west of the state adjoining Kwara State. Its headquarters is in the town of Odo Ere.

It has an area of 1,276 km and a population of 149,023 at the 2006 census.  By 2016, the population grew to 188,900.

Egbe is another prominent town in the Local Government popularised by Christian missionary activities in the early 1900s.

The postal code of the area is 262.

References

Local Government Areas in Kogi State
Local Government Areas in Yorubaland